Incentive Software Ltd. was a British video game developer and publisher founded by Ian Andrew in 1983. Programmers included Sean Ellis, Stephen Northcott and Ian's brother Chris Andrew.

Later games were based on the company's Freescape rendering engine. Developed in-house, Freescape is considered to be one of the first proprietary 3D engines to be used in computer games, although the engine was not used commercially outside of Incentive's own titles. The project was originally thought to be so ambitious that according to Ian Andrew, the company struggled to recruit programmers for the project, with many believing that it could not be achieved.

Paul Gregory (graphics artist for Major Developments, Incentive's in-house design team) mentions  that Freescape was developed by Chris Andrew starting in September 1986 on an Amstrad CPC, as it was the most suitable development system with 128K memory and had adequate power to run 3D environments. Due to the engine's success, it was later ported to all the dominant systems of the era: the ZX Spectrum, the IBM PC, the Commodore 64, Commodore Amiga and Atari ST. Freescape development ended in 1992 with the release of 3D Construction Kit II.

The company was renamed Dimension International as it moved into the VR field in 1995 with its next-generation Superscape VRT engine, then later changed name again to Superscape.

List of titles

The following games were published and/or developed by Incentive Software:

See also
Freescape
Superscape

References

External links
 Incentive Software at MobyGames
 Adventureland - Incentive Software Ltd

Companies based in Reading, Berkshire
Video game companies established in 1983
Defunct companies of England
Video game development companies
Video game publishers
Defunct video game companies of the United Kingdom